The 57th running of the Tour of Flanders cycling race in Belgium was held on Sunday 1 April 1973. Belgian Eric Leman won the classic ahead of Freddy Maertens and Eddy Merckx. The race started in Ghent and finished for the first time in Meerbeke (Ninove). 37 out of 174 riders arrived.

Course
Cycling icon Eddy Merckx was the pre-race favourite, but despite several attempts, he failed to distance Leman, Maertens and De Geest on the Muur van Geraardsbergen and the run-in to the finish. In a four-man sprint Eric Leman narrowly beat Freddy Maertens. Merckx was third. Leman became the third rider to win the Tour of Flanders three times, equalling the previous record of Achiel Buysse and Fiorenzo Magni.

Climbs
There were six categorized climbs:

Results

References

Further reading
 

Tour of Flanders
Tour of Flanders
Tour of Flanders
1973 Super Prestige Pernod